The 2022–23 Hockey East men's ice hockey season is the 39th season of play for Hockey East and will take place during the 2022–23 NCAA Division I men's ice hockey season. The regular season is set to begin on October 1, 2022 and conclude on March 4, 2023. The conference tournament is scheduled to begin in mid March, 2023.

Coaches
Greg Brown takes over for Jerry York at Boston College. York retired after his 50th season as a head coach with the last 28 being for the Eagles. Brown had previously been an assistant under York for 14 years and was the head coach for the Dubuque Fighting Saints prior to his hiring.

After Albie O'Connell was relieved of his coaching duties after the season, Boston University named his former assistant Jay Pandolfo as the team's head coach. Pandolfo is a BU alum who helped the program win the national championship in 1995. This is his first head coaching job.

Records

Standings

Statistics

Conference tournament

NCAA tournament

Ranking

USCHO

USA Today

Pairwise

Note: teams ranked in the top-10 automatically qualify for the NCAA tournament. Teams ranked 11-16 can qualify based upon conference tournament results.

References

External links

2022–23
Hockey East
2022–23